Landkreis Heilbronn is a Landkreis (district) in the north of Baden-Württemberg, Germany. Neighboring districts are (from north clockwise) Neckar-Odenwald, Hohenlohe, Schwäbisch Hall, Rems-Murr, Ludwigsburg, Enz, Karlsruhe and Rhein-Neckar. In the centre of it is the free-city of Heilbronn, which is its own separate administrative area.

History
The predecessor to the district is the Oberamt Heilbronn, which was created in 1803 when the previously Free Imperial City of Heilbronn was incorporated into the Electorate of Württemberg. In 1926, about half of the Oberamt (old district) of Weinsberg was added. In 1938, it was recognized as a district, and in addition to the previous Oberamt, parts of the dissolved Oberämter Neckarsulm, Brackenheim, Marbach and Besigheim were added. The city of Heilbronn was not included into the district. In 1973, the Landkreise (districts) were reorganized, and part of the dissolved districts of Sinsheim, Mosbach, Buchen and Schwäbisch Hall were added. Within the following two years 5 municipalities were incorporated into the city and therefore left the district, which got its current borders in 1975.

Geography
The main river in the district is the Neckar, which flows through the district from the south to the north. The western part of the district belongs to the landscape Kraichgau, the east to the Hohenloher Ebene, Kocher-Jagst-Ebene, and the Löwensteiner Berge.

Coat of arms
The coat of arms shows a clawless eagle, the symbol of the Counts of Lauffen, who ruled the area of the district in the 13th century.

Towns and municipalities

Towns (Städte):

 Bad Friedrichshall
 Bad Rappenau
 Bad Wimpfen
 Beilstein
 Brackenheim
 Eppingen
 Güglingen
 Gundelsheim
 Lauffen
 Leingarten
 Löwenstein
 Möckmühl
 Neckarsulm
 Neudenau
 Neuenstadt am Kocher
 Schwaigern
 Weinsberg
 Widdern

Municipalities (Gemeinden):

Abstatt
Cleebronn
Eberstadt
Ellhofen
Erlenbach (Württemberg)
Flein
Gemmingen
Hardthausen (Kocher)
Ilsfeld
Ittlingen
Jagsthausen
Kirchardt
Langenbrettach
Lehrensteinsfeld
Massenbachhausen
Neckarwestheim
Nordheim (Württemberg)
Obersulm
Oedheim
Offenau
Pfaffenhofen
Roigheim
Siegelsbach
Talheim
Untereisesheim
Untergruppenbach
Wüstenrot
Zaberfeld

Municipal associations (Vereinbarte Verwaltungsgemeinschaften and Gemeindeverwaltungsverbände):

Bad Friedrichshall
Bad Rappenau
Brackenheim
Eppingen
Flein-Talheim
Lauffen
Möckmühl
Neckarsulm
Neuenstadt
Oberes Zabergäu
Obersulm
Schozach-Bottwartal
Schwaigern
Raum Weinsberg

References

External links

Official website (German)

 
Stuttgart (region)
Districts of Baden-Württemberg